In number theory, Dirichlet's theorem on Diophantine approximation, also called Dirichlet's approximation theorem, states that for any real numbers  and , with , there exist integers  and  such that  and

This is a fundamental result in Diophantine approximation, showing that any real number has a sequence of good rational approximations: in fact an immediate consequence is that for a given irrational α, the inequality

is satisfied by infinitely many integers p and q. This shows that any irrational number has irrationality measure at least 2. This corollary also shows that the Thue–Siegel–Roth theorem, a result in the other direction, provides essentially the tightest possible bound, in the sense that the bound on rational approximation of algebraic numbers cannot be improved by increasing the exponent beyond 2. The Thue–Siegel–Roth theorem uses advanced techniques of number theory, but many simpler numbers such as the golden ratio  can be much more easily verified to be inapproximable beyond exponent 2. This exponent is referred to as the irrationality measure.

Simultaneous version

The simultaneous version of the Dirichlet's approximation theorem states that given real numbers  and a natural number  then there are integers  such that

Method of proof

Proof By The Pigeonhole Principle
This theorem is a consequence of the pigeonhole principle. Peter Gustav Lejeune Dirichlet who proved the result used the same principle in other contexts (for example, the Pell equation) and by naming the principle (in German) popularized its use, though its status in textbook terms comes later. The method extends to simultaneous approximation.

Proof Outline: Let  be an irrational number and  be an integer.
One can divide the interval  into  smaller intervals of measure . Now, we have  numbers  and  intervals. Therefore, by the pigeonhole principle, at least two of them are in the same interval. We can call those  such that . Now:

 

Dividing both sides by  will result in:

 

And we proved the theorem.

Proof By Minkowski's theorem
Another simple proof of the Dirichlet's approximation theorem is based on Minkowski's theorem applied to the set

 

This proof extends naturally to simultaneous approximations by considering the set

See also
Dirichlet's theorem on arithmetic progressions
Hurwitz's theorem (number theory)
Heilbronn set
Kronecker's theorem (generalization of Dirichlet's theorem)

Notes

References

External links

Diophantine approximation
Theorems in number theory